Victoria County is the name of several locations:

In Australia:
Victoria County, Western Australia
County of Victoria, South Australia

In Canada:
 Victoria County, New Brunswick
 Municipality of the County of Victoria and the eponymous historical county and census division
 Victoria County, Ontario, amalgamated in 2001 to a single tier municipality named Kawartha Lakes

In Trinidad and Tobago:
 Victoria County, Trinidad and Tobago

in the United States:
 Victoria County, Texas

County name disambiguation pages